Meena Kumari (born Mahjabeen Bano; 1 August 1933  – 31 March 1972) was an Indian actress and poet, who worked in Hindi films. Popularly known as The Tragedy Queen, she was active between 1939 and 1972. Kumari is widely considered one of the greatest actresses of Indian cinema. In a career spanning 33 years, from child actress to adult, she starred in over 90 films. She died at the age of 38 years, from cirrhosis of the liver, which has been associated with her alcoholism.

Kumari won four Filmfare Awards in the Best Actress category. She was the recipient of the inaugural Filmfare Best Actress Award for Baiju Bawra in 1954 and had a consecutive win in the second Filmfare Awards (1955) for Parineeta. Kumari made history at the 10th Filmfare Awards (1963) by receiving all three of the Best Actress nominations, and won for her performance in Sahib Bibi Aur Ghulam. In the 13th Filmfare Awards (1966), she won her last Best Actress award for Kaajal. Critics have noted that her character in Sahib Bibi Aur Ghulam is similar to her life.

Family background
Kumari's father was a Sunni Muslim named Master Ali Bux who had migrated from Bhera (now in Pakistan). He was a veteran of Parsi theater, played harmonium, wrote Urdu poetry, composed music and also played small roles in a few films. Kumari's mother Iqbal Begum, whose original name was Prabhavati Devi, was a Christian, who converted to Islam after her marriage. Iqbal Begum was the second wife of Ali Bux. Before meeting and marrying Ali Bux, she was a stage actress and was said to be related to the Tagore family of Bengal.

Connection with Tagore family
Kumari's grandmother, Hem Sundari Tagore, was either the daughter or a widow of Rabindranath Tagore's distant cousin. After the death of her husband, she was forced by his family to leave for Meerut, where she became a nurse, married a Christian named Pyare Lal Shakir Meeruti (1880–1956) who was an Urdu journalist and embraced Christianity.  She had two daughters; one of whom was Prabhavati, Kumari's mother.

Birth and childhood

Kumari was born with the name Mahjabeen to Ali Bux and Iqbal Begum on 1 August 1933. This was a great disappointment to Ali Bux as he wanted a son. She was the second daughter and had two sisters; the elder named Khursheed Jr. and the younger named Mahliqa (known as Madhu, a former child artist married to actor Mehmood) Her father could not afford to pay the doctor for her delivery, so he left her at an orphanage, but he changed his mind a few hours later and took her back home.

As a child, Kumari was not keen on having a film career, and would rather attend school. Despite this, her parents started taking her to film studios for work opportunities. Director Vijay Bhatt cast Mahjabeen in the film Leatherface and on her first day of work, she was paid Rs. 25.

Leatherface was released in 1939. She became the breadwinner in the Bux family at a very young age. In an interview given in 1962, Kumari explained that the fact that she had supported her parents from the age of four gave her immense satisfaction. She was admitted into a regular school, but the demands of work frequently interrupted her curriculum. She did not attend school in any meaningful sense, therefore her education was the result of private tuition and self-education.

Career

Early work as Baby Meena (1939–45)

Kumari began acting when she was four. She initially worked mostly in Vijay Bhatt productions; Leather Face (1939), Adhuri Kahani (1939), Pooja (1940) and Ek Hi Bhool (1940). Bhatt rechristened Mahjabeen as "Baby Meena" during the filming of Ek Hi Bhool (1940).

More films followed, namely Nai Roshni (1941), Bahen (1941), Kasauti (1941), Vijay (1942), Garib (1942), Pratiggya (1943) and Lal Haveli (1944).

Early career (1946–52)

She was cast under the name Meena Kumari in Ramnik Production's Bachchon Ka Khel (1946). One of the major setbacks in Kumari's life was the death of her mother who died on 25 March 1947. Duniya Ek Sarai (1946), Piya Ghar Aaja (earlier titled Jalan) (1948) and Bichchade Balam (1948) were some of her early films in which she not only acted but also sang songs. By the late 1940s, she shifted her focus to mythology or fantasy films. Veer Ghatotkach (1949), Shri Ganesh Mahima (1950), Laxmi Narayan (1951), Hanuman Patal Vijay (1951) and Aladdin Aur Jadui Chirag (1952) were films in which she is credited. Other films, such as Magroor (1950), Hamara Ghar (1950), Sanam (1951), Madhosh (1951), and Tamasha (1952), mostly had an ensemble cast. Kumari's rise came with her mentor Vijay Bhatt's musical, Baiju Bawra (1952).

Rising star (1952–56)

1952: Baiju Bawra – Kumari played the female lead in the film. Following its success, she featured as a model for Hindustan Lever products and on the calendar of a popular beauty soap.
1953: Parineeta – Directed by Bimal Roy, (featuring Ashok Kumar and Meena Kumari in lead) the film won Kumari her second Filmfare Best Actress Award. It was based on the 1914 Bengali novel by Sharat Chandra Chattopadhyay. Do Bigha Zamin – directed by Bimal Roy, won the International Prize at Cannes in 1954, the first Indian film to do so. This film also marks the first guest appearance of Kumari. Foot Path – directed by Zia Sarhadi, was Meena's first film with Dilip Kumar. This movie was featured in Avijit Ghosh's book,  40 Retakes: Bollywood Classics You May Have Missed. Daaera – was written and directed by Kamal Amrohi, starring Kumari, Nasir Khan and Nana Palsikar in lead roles. Other films included Naulakha Haar and Daana Paani.

1954: Chandni Chowk – directed by B. R. Chopra in 1954, a classic Muslim social drama film, was Chopra's second directorial venture and another success at the box office. Baadbaan - directed by Phani Majumdar, included a star cast of Kumari, Dev Anand, Ashok Kumar and Usha Kiran. Ilzaam – directed by R C Talwar, starring Kumari and Kishore Kumar, also premiered.
1955: In Azaad, directed by Sriramulu Naidu S.M., Kumari performed with Robinhood Dilip Kumar. It was the second highest-grossing Hindi film that year and included the song "Aplam Chaplam", sung by Lata Mangeshkar and Usha Mangeshkar. Adl-e-Jehangir – was a Hindi language historical drama film directed by G.P. Sippy. It became a commercial success at the box office.Bandish - directed by Satyen Bose starring Kumari, Ashok Kumar, and Daisy Irani was a box office hit. Rukhsana - was directed by R.C. Talwar and starred Kumari and Kishore Kumar.

1956: Mem Sahib – directed by R.C. Talwar, featured Kumari for the first time with Shammi Kapoor. The modern avatar of Kumari was well received by audiences and the film became a box office hit. Ek Hi Raasta – was a film based on the issue of widow remarriage, directed and produced by B. R. Chopra. It starred Kumari with newcomer Sunil Dutt, Ashok Kumar and Daisy Irani. The film proved to be successful at the box office and was screened for more than 25 weeks, which was a "Jubilee Hit". Bandhan - directed by Hemchandra Chunder, based on the popular Bengali novel Mantra Shakti, starred Kumari and Pradeep Kumar as leads. It was awarded with a Certificate of Merit in the National Film Awards. Naya Andaz – directed by K. Amarnath, starring Kumari and Kishore Kumar in lead roles, was a musical hit. Halaku – a historical, was directed by D.D. Kashyap which included Kumari, Pran, Minoo Mumtaz, Raj Mehra and Helen. It was a box office hit and celebrated a silver jubilee.

Tragedy queen of Indian cinema (1957) 

1957: Sharada – directed by L.V. Prasad, was Kumari's first venture with Raj Kapoor. She won best actress at Bengal Film Journalists' Association Award for her work. The film gained great critical success and was the ninth highest grossing film at the Indian Box Office in 1957. Miss Mary – a comedy film directed by L.V. Prasad, starred Kumari and Gemini Ganesan. The film was one of the biggest hits of that year.
1958: For Sahara – directed by Lekhraj Bhakri, Kumari received a Filmfare nomination. Yahudi, directed by Bimal Roy starred Kumari, Dilip Kumar, Sohrab Modi, Nazir Hussain and Nigar Sultana. It was based on the play Yahudi Ki Ladki by Agha Hashar Kashmiri, a classic in Parsi – Urdu theatre, about the persecution of Jews in the Roman Empire. The film was a box office hit with the song "Yeh Mera Diwanapan Hai" sung by Mukesh. Farishta. It starred Ashok Kumar and Kumari as protagonists. The film was rated as above average. Savera – was directed by Satyen Bose, with Kumari and Ashok Kumar in lead roles.

1959: Chirag Kahan Roshni Kahan, directed and produced by Devendra Goel, stars Kumari with Rajendra Kumar and Honey Irani. The film was a huge hit at the box office and Kumari received a Filmfare nomination for her performance in the Best Actress category. Char Dil Char Rahen – was directed by Khwaja Ahmad Abbas, with a star cast including Kumari, Raj Kapoor, Shammi Kapoor, Kumkum and Nimmi. The film received warm reviews from critics. Shararat – was a 1959 romantic drama film written and directed by Harnam Singh Rawail, starring Kumari, Kishore Kumar, Raaj Kumar and Kumkum in lead roles, with "Hum Matwaley Naujawan" sung by Kishore Kumar. Film Chand directed by Lekhraj Bhakri focused on the effects of polygamy prior to The Hindu Marriage Act, 1955. The film stars Kumari with Balraj Sahni, Pandari Bai and newcomer Manoj Kumar in lead roles. Her other films released in 1959 were Ardhangini, Satta Bazaar, Madhu and Jagir.
1960: Dil Apna Aur Preet Parai was a Hindi romantic drama written and directed by Kishore Sahu. The film starred Kumari, Raaj Kumar and Nadira as leads. The film narrates the story of a surgeon who is obligated to marry the daughter of a family friend, while he is in love with a colleague nurse, played by Kumari. It is one of her noted acting performances. The film's music is by Shankar Jaikishan, and features the Hawaiian-themed "Ajeeb Dastan Hai Yeh" sung by Lata Mangeshkar.Bahana – directed by Kumar, had a star cast including Kumari, Sajjan, Mehmood, Helen, Pramila, Sulochana Latkar and Sheela Vaz. Kohinoor – directed by S. U. Sunny featured Kumari, Dilip Kumar, Leela Chitnis and Kumkum. A film of lighter tone, it lacked the intense characterisations of earlier films of both Dilip Kumar and Kumari, who are known as the Tragedy King and Tragedy Queen respectively.
1961: Bhabhi Ki Chudiyan was a family drama directed by Sadashiv J. Row Kavi with Kumari and Balraj Sahni in the lead roles. The film was one of the highest-grossing films of the year. Zindagi aur Khwab – directed S. Bannerjee, starring Kumari and Rajendra Kumar, was a hit at the Indian box office. Pyaar Ka Saagar – was directed by Devendra Goel with Kumari and Rajendra Kumar.

Critical acclaim (1962)
Sahib Bibi Aur Ghulam

Sahib Bibi Aur Ghulam, a film produced by Guru Dutt and directed by Abrar Alvi featured Kumari in the role of Chhoti Bahu. It is based on the Bengali novel "Saheb Bibi Golam" by Bimal Mitra. The film stars Kumari, Guru Dutt, Rehman and Waheeda Rehman. Its music is by Hemant Kumar and the lyrics are by Shakeel Badayuni. The film is also noted for its cinematography by V. K. Murthy and the songs "Na Jao Saiyaan Chhuda Ke Baiyan" and "Piya Aiso Jiya Mein", both sung by Geeta Dutt.

For Sahib Bibi Aur Ghulam, to give the heavy appearance associated with excessive consumption of alcohol, she applied concentrated Eau de Cologne under her nose. The irritation helped her to achieve the visual appearance of an alcoholic.

The film won four Filmfare Awards, including the Best Actress award. It was nominated for the Golden Bear at the 13th Berlin International Film Festival, where Kumari was selected as a delegate. Sahib Bibi Aur Ghulam was chosen as India's official entry to the Oscars.

1962: Aarti, directed by Phani Majumdar, stars Kumari in the title role of Aarti, with Ashok Kumar, Pradeep Kumar and Shashikala appearing in pivotal roles.  Kumari won a Best Actress award for this film from the Bengal Film Journalists' Association. Main Chup Rahungi – directed by A. Bhimsingh with Kumari and Sunil Dutt in lead roles was one of the biggest hits of the year and Kumari received a Filmfare nomination for Best Actress for her performance.
1963: Dil Ek Mandir, directed by C. V. Sridhar, starring Kumari, Rajendra Kumar, Raaj Kumar and Mehmood, was a commercial success. Akeli Mat Jaiyo – directed by Nandlal Jaswantlal, is a romantic comedy with Kumari and Rajendra Kumar. Kinare Kinare was directed by Chetan Anand with Kumari, Dev Anand and Chetan Anand in lead roles.
1964: Sanjh Aur Savera – is a romantic drama film directed by Hrishikesh Mukherjee, starring Kumari, Guru Dutt and Mehmood. Benazir – is a Muslim social film directed by S. Khalil, starring Kumari, Ashok Kumar, Shashi Kapoor and Tanuja. Chitralekha directed by Kidar Sharma, starring Kumari, Ashok Kumar and Pradeep Kumar, is based on the 1934 Hindi novel by the same name by Bhagwati Charan Verma. Gazal featuring Kumari and Sunil Dutt, is a Muslim social film about the right of young generation to the marriage of their choice. Main Bhi Ladki Hoon was directed by A. C. Tirulokchandar. The film stars Kumari with newcomer Dharmendra.
1965: Kaajal directed by Ram Maheshwari, stars Kumari, Dharmendra, Raaj Kumar, Padmini, Helen, Mehmood and Mumtaz. The film was listed in the Top 20 films of 1965. Kumari won her fourth Filmfare award for Kaajal. The film was originally based on the novel "Maadhavi" by Gulshan Nanda. Bheegi Raat, directed by Kalidas, with Kumari, Ashok Kumar and Pradeep Kumar in lead roles, was one of the biggest hits of the year. The film Purnima, directed by Narendra Suri, features Kumari and Dharmendra in lead roles.
1966: Phool Aur Patthar, directed by O. P. Ralhan, stars Kumari and Dharmendra in lead roles. This film became a golden jubilee hit, catapulting Dharmendra to stardom and was the highest-grossing movie of the year. Kumari's performance in the film earned her a nomination in the Best Actress category in the Filmfare awards for that year. The film Pinjre Ke Panchhi was directed by Salil Choudhury, with Kumari, Balraj Sahni and Mehmood in main roles.
1967: Majhli Didi was directed by Hrishikesh Mukherjee and stars Kumari along with Dharmendra. The film was India's entry to the 41st Academy Awards for Best Foreign Language Film. The film Bahu Begum was directed by M. Sadiq, starring Kumari, Pradeep Kumar and Ashok Kumar. The film features music by Roshan and lyrics by Sahir Ludhianvi. Noor Jehan, directed by Mohammed Sadiq, is a historical film starring Kumari and Pradeep Kumar, with Helen and Johnny Walker in minor roles. It dramatises the epic love story of Empress Nur Jehan and her husband, the Mughal Emperor Jehangir. The film Chandan Ka Palna was directed by Ismail Memon, starring Kumari and Dharmendra. After the Eclipse, a 37 minutes color documentary directed by S. Sukhdev and shot in the suburbs of Varanasi features Kumari's voice along with the voice of actor Shashi Kapoor.
1968: Baharon Ki Manzil a Suspense Thriller, directed by Yakub Hassan Rizvi, stars Kumari, Dharmendra, Rehman and Farida Jalal. The film was one of the major hits of the year. The film Abhilasha was directed by Amit Bose. The cast includes Kumari, Sanjay Khan and Nanda.

Career slump and final works
By the early 1970s, Kumari eventually shifted her focus to more 'acting oriented' or character roles.
1970: Jawab was directed by Ramanna, starring Kumari, Jeetendra, Leena Chandavarkar and Ashok Kumar. Saat Phere was directed by Sundar Dhar, with Kumari, Pradeep Kumar and Mukri in pivotal roles.
1971: Mere Apne written and directed by Gulzar, was his first directorial venture. The film stars Kumari, Vinod Khanna and Shatrughan Sinha in lead roles along with Deven Verma, Paintal, Asit Sen, Asrani, Danny Denzongpa, Keshto Mukherjee, A. K. Hangal, Dinesh Thakur, Mehmood and Yogeeta Bali. Dushman, directed by Dulal Guha, stars Kumari, Rehman and Rajesh Khanna with Mumtaz in lead roles. The film became a "super-hit" at the box office.
 1972: Gomti Ke Kinare directed by Saawan Kumar Tak in his directorial debut, stars Kumari, Sanjay Khan and Mumtaz. Gomti Ke Kinare was released on 22 November 1972, after Kumari's death and was a tribute to her.

Completion of Pakeezah (1956–72)

The idea for Pakeezah came into existence in 1954, followed by its muhrat in 1956. Kumari was determined to complete the film and, aware of having limited time left to live, went out of her way to complete it early. Despite the rapid deterioration of her health, she made the finishing touches to her performance.

Pakeezah had a grand premiere on 3 February 1972 at Maratha Mandir theatre in central Bombay, and the prints were carried on a decked-up palanquin. The film was finally released on the following day, 4 February 1972. Pakeezah enjoyed a successful run of 33 weeks and even celebrated its silver jubilee. Kumari posthumously received her twelfth and last Filmfare nomination for Pakeezah. Bengal Film Journalists' Association Awards bestowed the Special Award to Meena Kumari for Pakeezah in 1973.

Career as a playback singer
Kumari was also a playback singer. She sang as a child artist for films like Bahen until 1945. As a heroine, she sang for films like Duniya Ek Sarai (1946), Piya Ghar Aaja (1948), Bichchade Balam (1948) and Pinjre Ke Panchhi (1966). She also sang for Pakeezah (1972), however, the song was not used in the film and was later released in the album Pakeezah-Rang Ba Rang (1977).

Personal life

Marriage to Kamal Amrohi (1952)
Kamal Amrohi met Kumari in 1938, while searching for a child actor for the film Jailor. Years later, on the sets of Tamasha, Ashok Kumar introduced filmmaker Kamal Amrohi to Kumari, who later offered her a lead role in his upcoming film Anarkali. The contract was signed on 13 March 1951 but on 21 May 1951, Kumari was involved in a car accident while returning from Mahabaleshwar to Bombay. She was admitted to Sassoon Hospital in Poona for an injury to the left hand and Amrohi visited her regularly.

This hospital love affair continued for four months. The accident left Kumari with a banded left little finger for life. She covered her left hand with a dupatta or saree during shoots. The film Anarkali was eventually shelved. On 14 February 1952, Kumari and Amrohi secretly married in a simple "Niqah" ceremony in the presence of a Qadi and Kumari's younger sister, Mahliqa (Madhu). After the ceremony, the newlyweds parted. Amrohi left for Sion and Kumari and Madhu returned home. The marriage was kept secret from the family and media, although Amrohi was already married and had three children from his previous wife. After several months, the marriage was leaked and Ali Bux recommended a divorce. Kumari remained adamant on her decision, but stayed in her father's house. Meanwhile, Amrohi planned a film called Daaera in 1953 and decided to cast Kumari, now his wife. She unsuccessfully asked for her father's permission, then left for her husband's residence at Sion.

Separation from husband and addiction to alcohol (1964)
After their marriage, Amrohi allowed Kumari to continue her acting career on certain conditions. She agreed, but with passing time she kept breaking them. Abrar Alvi, director of Sahib Bibi Aur Ghulam, recounts how Amrohi would have his spy and right-hand man Baqar Ali present even in the makeup room while his wife's makeup was being done.

According to Vinod Mehta, writer of her biography, Kumari was subjected to physical abuse in her marriage. He points out that although Amrohi repeatedly denied any such allegations, he learned from six different sources that she suffered. Events shared by actress Nargis pointed to the same. Such rumours found their base on the mahurat of Pinjre Ke Panchhi where Amrohi's assistant, Baqar Ali had a violent argument with Kumari. She immediately called for Amrohi who instead insisted that she return home. An enraged Kumari went to her sister, Madhu's home and never returned to Amrohi's.

Kumari had chronic insomnia. Upon her physician's advice, she started taking a small peg of brandy as a sleeping pill alternative. This prescribed peg of brandy turned into heavy drinking after her separation from her husband in 1964. After that, Kumari's name was associated with Gulzar, Dharmendra and Sawan Kumar Tak.

Deteriorating health and treatment in London (1968)
In 1968, Kumari was diagnosed with cirrhosis of liver and received treatments in London and Switzerland in June 1968.

Upon recovery, Kumari returned to India in September 1968 and resumed work. She temporarily recovered but was now weak and thin. After returning from London, Kumari for the first time purchased her own home, which was on the eleventh floor of a building called "Landmark", situated at Carter Road, Bandra.

Final days and death

Three weeks after the release of Pakeezah, Kumari became seriously ill. On 28 March 1972, she was admitted to St Elizabeth's Nursing Home.

She slipped into a coma two days later and died shortly afterwards on 31 March 1972. She was 38 years old. The cause of her death was determined to be liver cirrhosis. As per her husband's wish, she was buried at Rehmatabad Cemetery, located at Narialwadi, Mazagaon, Bombay. Kumari requested the following prose for her tombstone: "She ended life with a broken fiddle, with a broken song, with a broken heart, but not a single regret." As per his wish, upon his death on 11 February 1993 in Bombay, her husband was buried next to her.

The poet Naaz

Kumari was an Urdu poet under the pseudonym Naaz. Historian Philip Bounds and researcher Daisy Hasan wrote of Kumari's poetry: "Poetry was the medium through which Kumari distanced herself from her public image and criticized the industry that had brought her to public attention in the first place. In that sense, her poems tell us as much about Bollywood as they do about herself."

I write, I recite – an album consisting of Kumari's poems under the label of LP Vinyl Record was released in 1971, for which Mohammed Zahur Khayyam gave music. The poetry in the album (nazms) has been written, recited and sung by the poet herself. The album was re-released on 19 September 2006.
Tanha Chand (Lonely Moon), a collection of Kumari's poems, was compiled by Gulzar and published after her death in 1972.
 Meena Kumari, the Poet: A Life Beyond Cinema consisting of the late actress's poems and nazms was also published in 2014.

Legacy
Kumari was credited for never using products like glycerin to shed tears, but always shed genuine tears while acting. At the peak of her career, she was the highest-paid actress of her generation, and was the first to buy an Impala car. Indian Film Critic Bhawana Somaaya said: "There was a time when top heroes were not willing to work with Meena Kumari, because she played the powerful roles". Vinod Mehta said: "Meena Kumari became so powerful that she would make or break stars, Kumari adopted an attitude of guardian, artistic mentor towards the newcomers who worked opposite her like Rajendra Kumar in Chirag Kahan Roshni Kahan and with Sunil Dutt in Ek Hi Raasta." Another critic Afeefa Banu described her as "an object of fantasy and a motif of melancholy".  Kumari helped Dharmendra enormously in the initial stages of his career, and established his acting career in Indian Cinema. The Kathak master Pandit Lachhu Maharaj praised Kumari's dancing skills. He said, "The way in which she would turn, the angles of her shoulders, come naturally to her and cannot be taught." Ashok Kumar said: "Meena was a natural actress. She was very choosy, but once she accepted a role, she put her heart into it and it's not surprising that she's still remembered for her sensitive portrayals. Sometimes when saying a dialogue I'd add a line not in the script and even as I worried about how Meena would react, she'd surprise me with just the right response." In 1953, soon after the success of Baiju Bawra, Kumari appeared in Dream House, an advertisement by Dunlopillo UK along with Ashok Kumar. According to Indian Film Critic Bhawana Somaaya: "Pakeezah is just like poetry on celluloid, I cannot imagine anybody else in this movie except Meena Kumari."

Vinod Mehta (writer of Meena Kumari – The Classic Biography) was told by a director: "Even Dilip Kumar (the tragedy king) found it difficult to keep his calm in front of her". Raaj Kumar would often forget his dialogues while working with Kumari on set. Madhubala was also a fan of Kumari and said: "She has the most unique voice. No other heroine has it." Satyajit Ray described her as "undoubtedly an actress of the highest calibre". Amitabh Bachchan said "No one, not any one, ever spoke dialogues the way Meena Kumari did .. no one .. not anyone to date.. and perhaps never will". Music Director Naushad said "Hindi film industry may produce great actresses but there would never be another Meena Kumari". During the casting of Heeramandi, a webseries which chronicles the life of courtesans of Lahore, filmmaker Sanjay Leela Bhansali clearly cited Kumari's Pakeezah as his inspiration. Actress Alia Bhatt also mentioned watching Kumari's films for preparing for the role of a brothel madame in Gangubai Kathiawadi. Kumari empathized greatly with Marilyn Monroe, and the fact that Marilyn's husband, Arthur Miller, had some passing similarities to her husband Kamal Amrohi, made the identification closer.

Image and artistry

Kumari set fashion trends which are still in high demand. Javed Akhtar points out that women in the 1950s used to follow her sober and dignified fashion trends ranging from the hair bun to the traditional bindi. Director Sanjay Leela Bhansali has said that he appreciates the aesthetics of Pakeezah and the way Kumari played the role with grace and beauty. Her floral or traditional Banarasi silk and Kanjeevaram saris have never gone out of fashion and continue to be a favourite of designers like Sabyasachi Mukherjee. Tajdar Amrohi said: "When the shooting of Pakeezah started again in 1969, the first song shot was "Mausam Hai Ashiqaana". With this song, Kumari set a new fashion trend of girls wearing Lungi.

On 24 February 2016, Kumari's original publicity material and memorabilia, including paintings and portraits of her films, were displayed at the Womanhood Festival at Osianama Liberty, Mumbai, India.

Due to the contrast between her stardom and troubled private life, Kumari is closely linked to broader discussions about modern phenomena such as mass media, fame, and consumer culture. Every year, on her birthday, numerous articles are printed and television programmes aired to commemorate her, and modern magazines continue to publish stories on her personal life and career.

The greatest hallmark of Kumari is her ability to depict the struggle of Indian women existing especially in the 1950s and 1960s. Her onscreen persona is described as a perfect example of a traditional Bharatiya Naari by the Indian film fraternity, such as Mohammed Zahur Khayyam and Javed Akhtar. Her portrayal of "Sahibjaan", a nautch girl with a golden heart in Pakeezah under Amrohi's direction became a historical document.

Filmography and Accolades

Filmfare Award for Best Actress

 Records

 In 67 editions of the Filmfare Awards, Kumari's unusual feat of garnering all nominations in the Best Actress category remains unaccomplished by any other actress. She reached this pinnacle  ago at the 10th Filmfare Awards in 1963. 
 Kumari's record for the highest number of Filmfare Award for Best Actress remained unbroken for 13 years (1966–1979) until it was finally broken by Nutan at the 26th Filmfare Awards, 1979.
 Her record for the highest number of nominations in the Best Actress category (12) was eventually broken after 35 years by Madhuri Dixit at the 53rd Filmfare Awards, 2008.
 She is the only actress to be nominated posthumously. Kumari got a posthumous nomination for Pakeezah at the 20th Filmfare Awards in 1973.
Kumari not winning an award for her performance in Pakeezah stirred controversy at the 20th Filmfare Awards. Filmfare, however, defended their decision by stating that according to their rules, posthumous awards were not allowed then; Filmfare editor B. K. Karanjia said both Ghulam Mohammad (the music director of Pakeezah) and Josef Wirsching (cinematographer) lost for the same reason.

Bengal Film Journalists' Association Awards

Shama-Sushma Film Awards

Honors and tributes

On the day that Kumari died, her 1952 film Baiju Bawra was re-released at Bombay's Super cinema, drawing a full audience, which wept copiously while remembering the actress.

Shortly after her death, fellow actress Nargis wrote a personal essay in an Urdu magazine – Shama, titled "Meena – Maut Mubarak Ho". In October 1973, she also established the Meena Kumari Memorial for the Blind in her memory and was the chairman of this trust.

In 1979, Meena Kumari Ki Amar Kahaani, a film dedicated to the late actress was released. It was directed by Sohrab Modi and featured exclusive interviews of various film personalities, such as Raj Kapoor and Rajendra Kumar. The music for the film was composed by Khayyam. The following year, Shaira (alternatively titled Sahira) was released. It was a short documentary about Kumari and was directed by S Sukh Dev along with Gulzar. This documentary was produced by Kanta Sukhdev.

A postal stamp of face value 500 paise was issued in her honour on 13 February 2011 by India Post.

In 2010, Filmfare included Kumari's performances in Sahib Bibi Aur Ghulam and Pakeezah in its list of Bollywood's "80 Iconic Performances".  Two of her films, namely Baiju Bawra and Do Bigha Zameen, have been considered among the greatest films in a poll by the British Film Institute. On the occasion of the centenary of Indian cinema, in a poll conducted by News18 her films Pakeezah, Sahib Bibi Aur Ghulam and Do Bigha Zameen featured in the list of 100 best films ever made. Various publications including Hindustan Times mentioned her among the topmost sex symbols of Bollywood.

In 2012, Walk of the Stars, a section of the Bandstand Promenade in Bandra, Mumbai was opened to honour film artists from Hindi film industry. Kumari's autograph was also featured along with statues, handprints and autographs of other artists. Walk of the Stars was however, dissolved in 2014.

In May 2018, Ajeeb Dastaan Hai Yeh, a play depicting her life was staged at Rangayan auditorium of Jawahar Kala Kendra in Jaipur.

On 1 August 2018, search engine Google commemorated Kumari with a Doodle on her 85th birth anniversary. Google commented: "Kumari captivated audiences with her beautiful, expressive eyes and portrayed strong yet vulnerable women who made their own way through life, often devastated by romance. Today, her screen appearances are studied for flawless moments and the complex emotions she could evoke without uttering a word".

Biographies
 One of the first biographies of Kumari was written just after her death by Vinod Mehta in October 1972. The official biography of Kumari was titled Meena Kumari: The Classic Biography. The biography was re-published in May 2013.
 Simply Scandalous authored by Mohan Deep was an unofficial biography published in 1998. It was serialized in Mumbai's Hindi daily Dopahar Ka Saamna.
 Another biography about Kumari, Aakhri Adhai Din was written in Hindi by Madhup Sharma. The book was published in 2006.

In film
Kumari has always been a subject of interest among present day filmmakers. In 2004, a modern-day adaption of her classic film Sahib Bibi Aur Ghulam was to be made by Pritish Nandy Communications in which Aishwarya Rai and later Priyanka Chopra were to portray her role of Chhoti Bahu. However, the film got shelved and paved the way for a TV series helmed by director Rituparno Ghosh in which actress Raveena Tandon took this role.

In 2015, it was reported that Tigmanshu Dhulia was to make a film on Hindi cinema's Tragedy Queen, which was to be a screen adaptation of Vinod Mehta's book, "Meena Kumari – The Classic Biography". Actress Kangana Ranaut was approached to portray Kumari but the film was shelved yet again due to lack of authentic facts and after a strong protest by Kumari's stepson Tajdar Amrohi.

In 2017, director Karan Razdan also decided to direct an official biopic on her. For this, he approached Madhuri Dixit and Vidya Balan to play the Great Tragedienne but due to a variety of reasons, both of them declined the offer. He later turned to actress Sunny Leone who showed great interest to portray her onscreen. Various other actresses including Richa Chadha, Jaya Prada, Janhvi Kapoor, Karishma Sharma, Anupriya Goenka, Bhumi Pednekar, Divya Dutta, Kriti Sanon and Nithya Menon have also expressed their wish to portray Kumari onscreen.

In 2018, producer and former child artist Kutty Padmini announced a biopic on Kumari in the form of a web series along with singer Mohammed Rafi and actor-director J.P. Chandrababu. Padmini worked with Kumari in the film Dil Ek Mandir and wanted to honour the late actress with this biopic.

In 2019, Sanjay Leela Bhansali announced the remake of Kumari's 1952 classic Baiju Bawra with Alia Bhatt reprising Gauri's character, a role which was originally played by Kumari. Actress Deepika Padukone also expressed her desire to essay Kumari's role in the same film.  The shooting of the film is speculated to commence mid-2023.

In 2020, Almighty Motion Pictures announced a web series on Kumari's life which is to be based on the book Starring..Mahjabeen as Meena Kumari written by journalist Ashwini Bhatnagar. This was followed by Tajdar Amrohi's objection who accused the journalist of not only writing the late actress' biography without his consent but also portraying Kamal Amrohi as a tormentor. Bhatnagar later clarified that the book never portrayed Amrohi in a negative light and primarily focused on Kumari's professional career. He later argued that Kumari was a public figure and noone has the right to grant permission for creating a work of art. The series which will be followed by a feature film will be helmed by producer  Prabhleen Kaur Sandhu.

In February 2022, music label Saregama and actor Bilal Amrohi (grandson of Kamal Amrohi) announced a web series about the love story of Kumari and her filmmaker husband Kamal Amrohi against the backdrop of making the film Pakeezah. The series which will be helmed by Yoodlee films is expected to go on floors in 2023. The following month, it was reported that Kriti Sanon has been approached to play Kumari in a biopic planned by T–Series. By April 2022, the makers chose Hansal Mehta to be the director of the film.

The following year, a Pakistani remake of the film Pakeezah was announced in which actress Meera Jee was confirmed to play the central character, which was portrayed by Kumari in the original.

Notes

References

Bibliography

External links
 
 Meena Kumari at Manas: Culture of India
 Collection of verses by Meena Kumari

Indian film actresses
1933 births
1972 deaths
Deaths from cirrhosis
Actresses from Mumbai
Actresses in Hindi cinema
Poets from Maharashtra
Alcohol-related deaths in India
20th-century Indian actresses
20th-century Indian poets
Urdu-language poets from India
Women writers from Maharashtra
Indian women poets
20th-century Indian women writers
Filmfare Awards winners